Andrej Sládkovič (born as Andrej Braxatoris, pseudonyms Andrej Braxatoris-Sládkovič, Andrej Sládkovič, Ondřej Krasislav Sládkovič; 31 March 1820 – 20 April 1872) was a Slovak poet, critic, publicist, translator and Lutheran priest.

Life
Andrej Sládkovič was born into a family of teachers in Krupina. His school years started in his home town (1826–30). He later attended a gymnasium in Krupina and at the Lutheran lyceums in Banská Štiavnica and Bratislava. He continued his studies in theology at the University of Halle, Germany (1843–44). After he became a pastor, he served in Hrochoť from 1847 to 1856, and from then until his death in Radvaň nad Hronom. He was a member of the Ľudovít Štúr's group and was also one of the founders of the Matica slovenská.

Works
 (1843–44)
Marína (1846, his most significant poem, also translated into Hungarian, German, Polish and French)
 (1848)
 (1848)
Detvan (1853, an opera was made in 1928)
Milica (1858)
 (1861)
 (1863, remembers establishment of the Matica slovenská)
 (1863)
 (1864)
 (1866)

Sládkovič also translated works from German (Goethe), Russian (Pushkin) and French (Voltaire, Jean Racine).

External links
 
Andrej Sládkovič at osobnosti.sk 
A complete collection of his poems available for download at Zlatý fond SME 

1820 births
1872 deaths
Slovak poets
Martin Luther University of Halle-Wittenberg alumni
19th-century poets
People from Krupina
Translators of Johann Wolfgang von Goethe
Slovak translators
Slovak Lutherans